Safia Abdul Rahman  (born 5 May 1986) is a Ghanaian women's international footballer who plays as a forward for the Ghana women's national football team. She competed at the 2007 FIFA Women's World Cup. At the club level, she plays for Ghatel Ladies in Ghana.

References

1986 births
Living people
Ghanaian women's footballers
Ghana women's international footballers
Place of birth missing (living people)
2007 FIFA Women's World Cup players
Women's association football forwards